N60 may refer to:

Roads 
 Route nationale 60, in France
 N60 road (Ireland)
 N-60 National Highway, in Pakistan
 Ortigas Avenue, in Manila, Philippines

Other uses 
 Dalabon language
 Nikon N60, a camera
 Toyota 4Runner (N60), a Japanese SUV
 Toyota Hilux (N60), a Japanese pickup truck